Allenoconcha is a genus of air-breathing land snails or semi-slugs, terrestrial pulmonate gastropod mollusks in the family Euconulidae.

Species
 Allenoconcha basispiralis Preston, 1913
 Allenoconcha retinaculum (Preston, 1913)
Species brought into synonymy
 Allenoconcha belli Preston, 1913: synonym of Allenoconcha basispiralis Preston, 1913 (junior synonym)
 Allenoconcha congener Preston, 1913: synonym of Allenoconcha basispiralis Preston, 1913 (junior synonym)
 Allenoconcha mathewsi Preston, 1913: synonym of Allenoconcha basispiralis Preston, 1913 (junior synonym)
 Allenoconcha monspittensis Preston, 1913: synonym of Allenoconcha basispiralis Preston, 1913 (junior synonym)
 Allenoconcha perdepressa Preston, 1913: synonym of Allenoconcha basispiralis Preston, 1913 (junior synonym)
 Allenoconcha royana Preston, 1913: synonym of Allenoconcha basispiralis Preston, 1913 (junior synonym)

References

External links
 Preston, H. B. (1913). Characters of new genera and species of terrestrial Mollusca from Norfolk Island. The Annals and magazine of natural history; including zoology, botany, and geology. Eighth series. 12 (72): 522-538. London

Euconulidae
Gastropod genera